Pillerton Priors or Over Pillerton is a settlement and civil parish  south of Warwick, in the Stratford-on-Avon district, in the county of Warwickshire, England. In 2011 the parish had a population of 294. The parish touches Ettington, Oxhill and Pillerton Hersey. Pillerton Priors and Pillerton Hersey are jointly known as "The Pillertons".

Features 
There are 6 listed buildings in Pillerton Priors. Pillerton Priors once has a church called St Mary Magdalen's, the graveyard still exists but there's no remains of the church. Pillerton Priors has a village hall.

History 
The name "Pillerton" means 'Farm/settlement connected with Pilheard'. The "Priors" part from the fact that it was held by the Abbot of Evroult in 1086. Pillerton Priors was recorded in the Domesday Book as Pilardetune. There are medieval boundary ditches around the village of Pillerton Priors which possibly show the extent of the medieval village.

References

External links 

 Parish council

Villages in Warwickshire
Civil parishes in Warwickshire
Stratford-on-Avon District